Nottage Halt railway station was a small halt on the Porthcawl branch line, serving the village of Nottage in South Wales.

It first opened around 1900 as an unadvertised halt named Porthcawl Golfers Platform (or Golf Platform). In 1924 it was made a public halt called Nottage Halt. It had a single platform constructed in brick. Unlike many unstaffed halts in South Wales, the shelter at Nottage was a comparatively smart and substantial structure, with a tiled roof and brick chimney. The station was popular throughout its life, and was often referred to as Golf Station (the Royal Porthcawl Golf Club is nearby).

Nottage Halt closed to passengers in 1963, along with the whole of the Porthcawl branch. The closure came despite the fact that passenger receipts remained profitable. The line through the station closed in 1965.

The remains of the halt are still visible. The trackbed is little more than a rough pathway.

Notes

Railway stations in Great Britain opened in 1924
Railway stations in Great Britain closed in 1963
Former Great Western Railway stations
Disused railway stations in Bridgend County Borough
1924 establishments in Wales
1963 disestablishments in Wales